Samuel Sidley (1829–1896) was an English portrait painter.

Life 
Samuel Sidley, born in Yorkshire in 1829, first studied art in the school of art at Manchester. Subsequently he came to London and was admitted to the schools of the Royal Academy. In 1855 he exhibited for the first time at the Royal Academy, sending An Ancient Mariner. He became chiefly known as a successful portrait-painter, and gained frequent commissions for official and presentation portraits. Among these were portraits of Professor Fawcett, Bishop Colenso (presented by his family to the National Portrait Gallery), Lady Brassey, the Duke and Duchess of Buckingham, and other persons of note. He also painted some subject pictures, of which Alice in Wonderland, The Challenge, and a few others, were engraved and met with some popularity. Sidley continued to paint up to the time of his death, which took place at 8 Victoria Road, Kensington, on 9 July 1896. He was a member of the Royal Society of British Artists, and an original associate of the Royal Cambrian Academy.

Gallery

References

Sources 
Attribution:

Further reading 

 Graves, Algernon (1884). A Dictionary of Artists Who Have Exhibited Works in the Principal London Exhibitions of Oil Paintings From 1760 to 1880. London: George Bell and Sons. p. 214.
 Oliver, Valerie Cassel, ed. (2011). "Sidley, Samuel". Benezit Dictionary of Artists. Oxford Art Online. Retrieved 19 September 2022.
 "Obituary". The Times. 10 July 1896. p. 9. Retrieved 19 September 2022 – via Gale.

 

1829 births
1896 deaths
19th-century English painters
English portrait painters